Penryn railway station is on the Maritime Line between Truro and Falmouth Docks, and serves the town of Penryn, Cornwall as well as Penryn Campus (formerly known as Tremough Campus). The services are operated by Great Western Railway.

History
The station was opened on 24 August 1863 when the Cornwall Railway opened the line from Truro to Falmouth, it was sometimes known as Penryn for Helston.  

It originally had 2 platforms either side of a passing loop, a goods shed with several sidings to south, one of which was equipped with a 2-ton crane, the yard was able to accommodate live stock and most types of goods.

On 24 June 1923 the station was relocated nearby. The station was host to a GWR camp coach from 1934 to 1938. 

The station layout was rationalised to just a single platform when the line was being run by British Rail.

On Monday 8 April 2013 Pay and display was introduced for the station car park.

Passing Loop 
A new  passing loop was installed in 2008,  being brought into use in 2009 before the new timetable commenced on 17 May as this called for two trains to be in operation on the branch for most of the day.  To pay for this work £4.67million was provided from European Union funds, £2.5million from Cornwall Council, and £600,000 from Network Rail.  The new works were formally opened by Kevin Lavery, the Chief Executive of Cornwall Council, on 18 May 2009.

When constructing the loop a novel approach was adopted which avoided the building of a footbridge and works to the disused platform. The formerly disused northern end of the platform has been reinstated, and is now called Platform 2, and an extension has been built onto the southern end which is now called Platform 1. The middle section of the platform is now used to pass between the two. New modern shelters have been built on each platform, and the brick shelter from 1998 still exists.

The disused platform on the far side of the loop line was formerly used by northbound trains towards Truro.

Signalling

Signals are controlled from the signal box at Truro. Axle counters allow one train to be in the section between Penwithers Junction and Penryn, and another between Penryn and Falmouth Docks. The Up and Down Branch line (the platform line) is signalled for trains in either direction; the Down Loop is only signalled for trains towards Falmouth.

Services 
All trains on the Maritime Line are operated by Great Western Railway. They run seven days each week and operate every half-hour Monday to Saturday daytime and hourly at other times. Trains are scheduled to depart simultaneously for Truro and Falmouth.

Community Rail 
The railway from Truro to Falmouth is designated as a community rail line and is supported by marketing provided by the Devon and Cornwall Rail Partnership. The line is promoted under the "Maritime Line" name.

References

Further reading

External links

Railway stations in Cornwall
Former Great Western Railway stations
Railway stations in Great Britain opened in 1863
Railway stations served by Great Western Railway
Penryn, Cornwall
DfT Category F1 stations